UTC−03:00 is an identifier for a time offset from UTC of −03:00.

As standard time (Northern Hemisphere winter)

Europe

Atlantic and Arctic Ocean 
Denmark
Greenland
All the west coast of Greenland
Including Qaanaaq, Ilulissat, Kangerlussuaq, Nuuk and Qaqortoq
Tasiilaq and Kulusuk on the east coast
Except areas around Danmarkshavn, Ittoqqortoormiit and Pituffik (Thule), Thule Air Base
France
Saint Pierre and Miquelon

As daylight saving time (Northern Hemisphere summer)
Principal cities: Halifax, Hamilton

North America
Canada – Atlantic Time Zone
New Brunswick
Newfoundland and Labrador
Labrador
Except the area between L'Anse-au-Clair and Norman's Bay
Nova Scotia
Prince Edward Island
Denmark
Greenland
Pituffik (Thule)
United Kingdom
Bermuda

As standard time (year-round)
Principal cities: São Paulo, Brasília, Rio de Janeiro, Porto Alegre, Belo Horizonte, Buenos Aires, Montevideo, Paramaribo, Saint-Pierre, Stanley

South America
Argentina
Brazil
Except the western states of Acre, Amazonas, Mato Grosso, Mato Grosso do Sul, Rondônia and Roraima; and offshore islands
Chile
Magallanes/Antarctic
France
French Guiana
Suriname
United Kingdom
Falkland Islands
Uruguay

Antarctica

Southern Ocean
Some bases on the Antarctic Peninsula and nearby islands. See also Time in Antarctica
Argentina
Argentine Antarctica
Carlini Base
San Martin Base
United Kingdom
British Antarctic Territory
Rothera Research Station
United States
Palmer Station

As daylight saving time (Southern Hemisphere summer)
Principal cities: Santiago, Asunción

South America
Chile (except Easter Island and Magallanes/Antarctic)
Paraguay

Antarctica
Some bases on the Antarctic Peninsula and nearby islands. See also Time in Antarctica

Places using UTC−03:00, outside the 45°W ± 7.5° range
El Chaltén, Argentina (72°53′W corresponding to UTC−04:51)
Qaanaaq, Greenland (69°13′W corresponding to UTC−04:37)
Buenos Aires, Argentina (58°22′W corresponding to UTC−03:53:48)
Stanley, Falkland Islands (57°51'W corresponding to UTC−03:51:24)
Uruguaiana, Brazil (57°05'W corresponding to UTC–03:48)
Montevideo, Uruguay (56°23’W corresponding to UTC−03:44:51)
Saint Pierre and Miquelon (56°12′W corresponding to UTC−03:44:40)
Upernavik, Greenland (56°08′W corresponding to UTC−03:44:36)
Paramaribo, Suriname (55°10′W corresponding to UTC−03:40:40)
Kulusuk, Greenland (37°11′W corresponding to UTC−02:28)
Recife, Brazil (34°54′W corresponding to UTC−02:19:36)

Other uses
While Ethiopia and Eritrea both officially use UTC+03:00, Ethiopian and Eritrean culture follow a time system with two 12-hour cycles for day and night, and is 6 hours "slower" than the official time. The day begins with the day cycle at sunrise (6:00 a.m., but designated as 12 o'clock by local rendition) till sunset, followed by the night cycle (official 6:00 p.m., unofficial 12:00 night cycle). Therefore, the people of Ethiopia and Eritrea effectively follow UTC−03:00 instead of UTC+03:00.

See also
Time in Argentina
Time in Brazil
Time in Canada
Time in Chile
Time in Denmark
Time in Paraguay
Time in Uruguay

References

External links

UTC offsets
Time in Brazil
Time in Chile
Time in Paraguay
Time in Canada